The 2017 European Rugby Champions Cup Final was the final match in the 2016–17 European Rugby Champions Cup, and the twenty-second European club rugby final in general.  It was contested by defending champions Saracens of England and French side Clermont at Murrayfield Stadium, in Edinburgh, Scotland, on Saturday 13 May 2017.
Saracens retained the trophy after claiming a 28–17 victory.

Background
Reigning champions Saracens entered the final aiming to defend their title, having won the Champions Cup for the first time when they defeated Racing 92 by 21–9 in the 2016 final. The club was also looking to break the record for most unbeaten European fixtures in a row, after matching the record of 17 held by Leinster. Meanwhile, Clermont were seeking their first top-tier European trophy, following two prior defeats in the 2013 and 2015 finals, both to Toulon. For the second year running, Welsh referee Nigel Owens officiated the Champions Cup final – in doing so, he also became the first official to referee 100 European club rugby matches.

Route to the final

Note: In all results below, the score of the finalist is given first (H: home; A: away).

Match

Summary
After both teams enjoyed attacking spells in the opening 10 minutes without putting points on the board, Saracens opened the scoring when the ball was spread towards the right wing to Alex Goode, who placed a grubber kick behind the Clermont defenders which was collected by Chris Ashton. The try, which could not be converted, saw Ashton overtake Vincent Clerc as the top try scorer in European rugby history. Saracens extended their lead soon after when George Kruis powered over from close range for the team's second try, this time converted successfully by Owen Farrell. A short time later, Clermont responded when a break by Aurélien Rougerie set up Remi Lamerat for their first try of the game, converted by Morgan Parra. This left the half-time score at 12–7 to Saracens.

In the second half, the first ten minutes again went scoreless, until a Farrell penalty. Clermont then brought the game to within just one point via a team move, which started with Scott Spedding counter-attacking from his own try line and ended with Nick Abendanon going over for the try, converted again by Parra. Following an exchange of penalties between Farrell and Parra, which kept the scoreline at a one-point advantage to Saracens, each team had try-scoring opportunities, but to no avail. Finally, in the closing stages, Saracens made their persistent pressure count when Goode crossed the line for a try in the corner, with Farrell landing a difficult conversion from out wide. With one last penalty, Saracens cemented their victory at 28–17, becoming only the fourth reigning champions in the tournament's 22-year history to successfully retain their title.

Saracens Number 8 Billy Vunipola was named the official Man of the Match, while fly-half Owen Farrell was presented with the 2017 ERCC Player of the Year Award. In securing victory, Saracens also achieved a record 18 consecutive unbeaten European games – a record stretching back to the first round of the 2015–2016 cup.

Details

References

Final
2017
ASM Clermont Auvergne matches
Saracens F.C. matches
2016–17 in French rugby union
2016–17 in English rugby union
European Rugby Champions Cup Final
European Rugby Champions Cup Final
Rugby union in Edinburgh
International sports competitions in Edinburgh
2010s in Edinburgh